Mikaelsson is a Swedish surname that may refer to
John Mikaelsson (1913–1987), Swedish race walker 
Pär Mikaelsson (born 1970), Swedish ice hockey player 
Sven Mikaelsson (born 1943), Swedish alpine skier 
Tobias Mikaelsson (born 1988), Swedish football player 

Swedish-language surnames
Patronymic surnames
Surnames from given names